The 2016 Singapore League Cup (known as The New Paper League Cup for sponsorship reasons) is the tenth edition of the Singapore League Cup, Singapore's premier club football tournament organised by the Football Association of Singapore.  Albirex Niigata (S) are the defending champions, having won their second trophy the previous year. The tournament was held from 13 to 30 July 2016.

Teams

A total of 8 teams participate in the 2016 Singapore League Cup with all clubs coming from the S.League. Garena Young Lions did not be participating in this edition of the Singapore League Cup.

  Albirex Niigata (S)
 Balestier Khalsa
  DPMM FC
 Geylang International
 Home United
 Hougang United
 Tampines Rovers
 Warriors FC

Group stage

Group A

Group B

Knockout phase

Bracket

Semi-finals

Final

Plate knockout phase
The plate knockout phase involved the four teams that finished third in the preliminary phase of the tournament. There are two rounds of matches, with each round eliminating half of the teams entering that round. The successive rounds were: semi-finals and final. For each game in the plate knockout phase, a draw was followed by thirty minutes of extra time (except the final); if scores were still level there would be a penalty shoot-out to determine who progressed to the next round.

Plate semi-finals

Plate final

Statistics

Top scorers

Winners

See also
 S.League
 Singapore FA Cup
 Singapore Cup
 Singapore Community Shield
 Football Association of Singapore
 List of football clubs in Singapore

References

2016
League Cup
2016 domestic association football cups
July 2016 sports events in Asia